Moneilema appressum is a species of beetle in the family Cerambycidae. It was described by John Lawrence LeConte in 1852.

References

Moneilemini
Beetles described in 1852